The 2020 Úrvalsdeild karla, also known as Pepsi-deild karla for sponsorship reasons, was the 109th season of top-flight Icelandic football. Twelve teams contested the league, including the defending champions KR, who won their 27th league title in 2019.

The season was scheduled to begin on 22 April 2020 and conclude on 26 September 2020, however this was delayed due to the COVID-19 pandemic. The competition was suspended on 7 October and abandoned on 30 October 2020. The standings based on the average number of points per matches played for each team were considered final and used to determine the champions, European spots and relegation.

Teams

The 2020 Úrvalsdeild is contested by twelve teams, ten of which played in the division the previous year and two teams promoted from 1. deild karla. The bottom two teams from the previous season, Grindavík and ÍBV, were relegated to the 2020 1. deild karla and were replaced by Grótta and Fjölnir, champions and runners-up of the 2019 1. deild karla respectively.

Club information

Personnel and kits

Managerial changes

League table

Results
Each team was originally scheduled to play home and away once against every other team for a total of 22 games each.

Top goalscorers

References

External links
  

Úrvalsdeild karla (football) seasons
1
Iceland
Iceland
Úrvalsdeild